Vernham Street is a small village in the civil parish of Vernhams Dean situated in the North Wessex Downs Area of Outstanding Natural Beauty in the Test Valley district of Hampshire, England.

References

Villages in Hampshire